Mainly Mother Goose is the sixth album by popular children's entertainers Sharon, Lois & Bram, originally released in 1984. It has been re-released several times, but the artwork on the front covers remained basically the same.

It was the first album of Sharon, Lois & Bram's to have a central theme throughout the entire album (aka Nursery Rhymes/Mother Goose). Mainly Mother Goose was also the first of the Sharon, Lois & Bram albums to be originally released on CD as well as LP Record and Cassette. A songbooklet with words & music to all the songs was included in the original releases.

Releases
1984 (Elephant Records) (CANADA) LP Record/Cassette/CD
1990 (A&M Records) (USA) LP Record/Cassette/CD
1995 (Drive Entertainment) (USA) Cassette/CD
2004/2005/2008 (Casablanca Kids Inc.) (CANADA) CD

Nominations & Awards

Parent's Choice Award, Children's Recording (1984)
American Library Association Award, Notable Children's Recording (1985)
Parent's Choice GOLD Award (1985)
Double Platinum

Track listing
 "Humpty Dumpty"
 "Move Over"
 "Simple Simon"
 "Walking Up the Stair"
 "Such A Gettin' Upstairs / Old John Rabbit"
 "Miss Muffet / The Eensy Weensy Spider"
 "Terrence McDiddler / Three Little Fishies / 'Ishin'"
 "Riding & Marching Medley"
 "Diddle Diddle Dumpling"
 "Old King Cole / Der Rebbe Elimelech"
 "Bluebird, Bluebird"
 "There Was A Little Girl"
 "Cats & Mice Medley"
 "Five Green Apples"
 "Food Medley"
 "Doctor Tinker Tinker"
 "Pop! Goes the Weasel"
 "Little Rabbit Foo-Foo"
 "Tom, Tom The Piper's Son"
 "Jack & Jill"
 "Ha-Ha, This-A-Way"
 "Two Little Blackbirds / Five Little Chickadees"
 "El Sereno"
 "Mary Had A Little Lamb"
 "Rub-A-Dub-Dub"
 "Jump Josie / Skip to My Loo"
 "A Riddle"
 "Rain Medley"
 "Jumping Joan"
 "Oh Dear, What Can the Matter Be?"
 "Ride a Cock-Horse / Rings On Her Fingers"
 "Ten Little Fingers"
 "Arabella Miller"
 "As I Was Going Out One Day"
 "Savez-Vous Planter Les Choux?"
 "Old Woman, Old Woman"
 "Lavender's Blue"
 "Pat-A-Cake, Pat-A-Cake"
 "Fais Do Do / Rock-A-Bye, Baby"
 "I Had A Little Doll"

1984 albums
Sharon, Lois & Bram albums